Association Sportive de Corbeil-Essonnes (ASCE) is a multi-sport club located in Corbeil-Essonnes, France. Under the ASCE Union, it brings together 30 sections of ASCE.

Sections 

 
 AS Corbeil-Essonnes Football (closed down in 2016)
 AS Corbeil-Essonnes XIII Spartans

References

External links 

 Club website
Sport in Essonne
Sports clubs in France